Lady Alice St Clair-Erskine (born 14th June 1988), also known by her stage name Alice St Clair, is an English actress known for playing Kate Middleton in William & Catherine: A Royal Romance and Flora Marshall in  The Crimson Field.

Biography
St Clair was born in 1989, the elder daughter of Peter St Clair-Erskine, 7th Earl of Rosslyn and Helen Watters. She was educated at Heathfield St Mary's School and Bedales School. St Clair is also a poet who works under the name of Alan Moon and a voice-over artist whose work includes Air B and B, BBC Radio 4's Homefront and BBC Radio 3's Words and Music.

St Clair spent her early years in Los Angeles, where she worked for Akiva Goldsman before moving to New York City and attending the New York Conservatory for Dramatic Arts on an acting scholarship. Her first film appearance was in 2010 in Sarah's Key.

In 2011, she appeared as Kate Middleton in the Hallmark Channel TV movie William & Catherine: A Royal Romance. In 2015, she played Flora Marshall in the BBC television drama series The Crimson Field. In 2018 St Clair starred as Catherine de Valois in The New Generation Festival's Henry V.

Filmography

Film

Television

References

External links
 

Living people
1989 births
21st-century British actresses
People educated at Heathfield School, Ascot
People educated at Bedales School
Daughters of British earls
Alice